Indus–Mesopotamia relations are thought to have developed during the second half of 3rd millennium BCE, until they came to a halt with the extinction of the Indus valley civilization after around 1900 BCE. Mesopotamia had already been an intermediary in the trade of lapis lazuli between the Indian subcontinent and Egypt since at least about 3200 BCE, in the context of Egypt-Mesopotamia relations.

Neolithic expansion (9000–6500 BCE)

A first period of indirect contacts seems to have occurred as a consequence of the Neolithic Revolution and the diffusion of agriculture after 9000 BCE.  The prehistoric agriculture of South Asia is thought to have combined local resources, such as humped cattle, with agricultural resources from the Near East as a first step in the 8th–7th millennium BCE, to which were later added resources from Africa and East Asia from the 3rd millennium BCE. Mehrgarh is one of the earliest sites with evidence of farming and herding in South Asia. At Mehrgarh, around 7000 BCE, the full set of Near Eastern incipient agricultural products can be found: wheat, barley, as well as goats, sheep and cattle. The rectangular houses of Mehrgarh as well as the female figurines are essentially identical with those of the Near East.

The Near-Eastern origin of South Asian agriculture is generally accepted, and it has been the "virtual archaeological dogma for decades". Gregory Possehl however argues for a more nuanced model, in which the early domestication of plant and animal species may have occurred in a wide area from the Mediterranean to the Indus, in which new technology and ideas circulated fast and were widely shared. Today, the main objection to this model lies in the fact that wild wheat has never been found in South Asia, suggesting that either wheat was first domesticated in the Near-East from well-known domestic wild species and then brought to South Asia, or that wild wheat existed in the past in South Asia but somehow became extinct without leaving a trace.

Jean-François Jarrige argues for an independent origin of Mehrgarh. Jarrige notes "the assumption that farming economy was introduced full-fledged from Near-East to South Asia," and the similarities between Neolithic sites from eastern Mesopotamia and the western Indus valley, which are evidence of a "cultural continuum" between those sites. But given the originality of Mehrgarh, Jarrige concludes that Mehrgarh has an earlier local background, and is not a "'backwater' of the Neolithic culture of the Near East."

Land and maritime relations

Sea levels have been rising about 100 meters over the last 15,000 years until modern times, with the effect that coast lines have been receding vastly. This is especially the case of the coast lines of the Indus and Mesopotamia, which were originally only separated by a distance of about 1000 kilometers, compared to 2000 kilometers today. For the ancestors of the Sumerians, the distance between the coasts of the Mesopotamian area and the Indus area would have been much shorter than it is today. In particular the Persian Gulf, which is only about 30 meters deep today, would have been at least partially dry, and would have formed an extension of the Mesopotamian basin.

The westernmost Harappan city was located on the Makran coast at Sutkagan Dor, near the tip of the Arabian peninsula, and is considered as an ancient maritime trading station, probably between modern day Pakistan and the Persian Gulf.

Sea-going vessels were known in the Indus region, as shown by seals showing ships with land-finding birds (disha-kaka), dating to 2500-1750 BCE. When a boat was lost at sea, with land beyond the horizon, birds released by the mariners would securely fly back to land, and therefore show the boats the way to safety. Various stamp seals are known from the Indus and the Persian Gulf area, with depictions of large ships pertaining to different shipbuilding traditions. Sargon of Akkad (c. 2334–2284 BCE) claimed in one of his inscriptions that "ships from Meluhha, Magan and Dilmun made fast at the docks of Akkad".

Commercial and cultural exchanges
Many archaeological finds suggest that maritime trade along the shores of Africa and Asia started several millennia ago. Indus pottery and seals have been found along the sea routes between the Indus and Mesopotamia, as in Ras al-Jinz, at the tip of Arabia.

Indus imports into Mesopotamia

Clove heads, thought to originate from the Moluccas in Maritime Southeast Asia were found in a 2nd millennium BCE site in Terqa. Evidence for imports from the Indus to Ur can be found from around 2350 BCE. Various objects made with shell species that are characteristic of the Indus coast, particularly Trubinella Pyrum and Fasciolaria Trapezium, have been found in the archaeological sites of Mesopotamia dating from around 2500-2000 BCE. Carnelian beads from the Indus were found in Ur tombs dating to 2600–2450. In particular, carnelian beads with an etched design in white were probably imported from the Indus Valley, and made according to a technique of acid-etching developed by the Harappans. Lapis Lazuli was imported in great quantity by Egypt, and already used in many tombs of the Naqada II period (circa 3200 BCE). Lapis Lazuli probably originated in northern Afghanistan, as no other sources are known from that time, and had to be transported across the Iranian plateau to Mesopotamia, and then Egypt.

Several Indus seals with Harappan script have also been found in Mesopotamia, particularly in Ur, Babylon and Kish. The water buffalos that appear on Akkadian cylinder seals from the time of Naram-Sin (circa 2250 BCE) may have been imported to Mesopotamia from the Indus as a result of trade.

Akkadian Empire records mention timber, carnelian and ivory as being imported from Meluhha by Meluhhan ships, Meluhha being generally considered as the Mesopotamian name for the Indus Valley.

After the collapse of the Akkadian Empire, Gudea, the ruler of Lagash, is recorded as having imported "translucent carnelian" from Meluhha. Various inscriptions also mention the presence of Meluhha traders and interpreters in Mesopotamia. About twenty seals have been found from the Akkadian and Ur III sites, that have connections with Harappa and often use Harappan symbols or writing.

Mesopotamian imports into the Indus

Possible iconographical influences
Various authors have described possible iconographical influences from Mesopotamia to the Indus Valley. Gregory Possehl notes "Mesopotamian themes in Indus iconography", particularly designs related to the Gilgamesh epic, suggesting that "some aspects of Mesopotamian religion and ideology would have been accepted at face value is a reasonable notion". Damodar Dharmananda Kosambi also describes the presence of Gilgamesh on Indus seals. In the archaeological sites of the Indus valley civilization, twenty-four stone haematite weights of the Mesopotamian barrel-shaped type were found at Mohenjo-daro and Harappa.

There are also many instances of influence the other way round, in which Indus Valley seals and designs have been found in Mesopotamia.

Indus Valley stamp seals
Some Indus seals seem to show possible Mesopotamian influence, as in the "Gilgamesh" motif of a man fighting two lions (2500-1500 BCE).

Several Indus Valley seals show a fighting scene between a tiger-like beast and a man with horns, hooves and a tail, who has been compared to the Mesopotamian bull-man Enkidu, also a partner of Gilgamesh, and suggests a transmission of Mesopotamian mythology.

Cylinder seals
A few rare cylinder seals have been found in Indus valley sites, which suggest Mesopotamian influence: they were probably made locally, but they use Mesopotamian motifs. One such cylinder seal, the Kalibangan seal, shows a battle between men in the presence of centaurs. Other seals show processions of animals.

Others have suggested that the cylinder seals show the Indus valley's influence on Mesopotamia. These may have been due to overland trade between the two cultures.

Scripts and languages

Similarities between Proto-Elamite (circa 3000 BCE) and especially Linear Elamite (2300-2000 BCE) scripts with the Indus script have been noted, although it has not been possible to decipher any of them. Proto-Elamite only starts to be readable from around 2300 BCE, when Elamite adopted the cuneiform system. These Elamite scripts are said to be "technically similar" to the Indus script. On comparing the Linear Elamite to the Indus script, a number of similar symbols have also been found.

The Meluhhan language was not readily understandable at the Akkadian court, since interpretators of the Meluhhan language are known to have resided in Mesopotamia, particularly through an Akkadian seal with the inscription "Shu-ilishu, interpreter of the Meluhhan language".

Chronology

Sargon of Akkad (circa 2300 or 2250 BCE), was the first Mesopotamian ruler to make an explicit reference to the region of Meluhha, which is generally understood as being the Baluchistan or the Indus area. Sargon mentions the presence of Meluhha, Magan, and Dilmun ships at Akkad.

These dates correspond roughly to the Mature Harappan phase, dated from around 2600 to 2000 BCE. The dates for the main occupation of Mohenjo-Daro are from about 2350 to 2000/1900 BCE.

It has been suggested that the early Mesopotamian Empire preceded the emergence of the Harappan civilization, and that trade and cultural exchanges may have facilitated the emergence of Harappan culture. Alternatively, it is possible that the Harappan culture had already emerged by the time trade with Mesopotamia started. Uncertainties in dating make it impossible to establish a clear order at this stage.

Exchanges seem to have been most significant during the Akkadian Empire and Ur III periods, and to have waned afterwards together with the disappearance of the Indus valley civilization.

Comparative sizes
The Indus Valley Civilization only flourished in its most developed form between 2500 and 1800 BCE until it became extinct, but at the time of these exchanges, it was a much larger entity than the Mesopotamian civilization, covering an area of 1.2 million square kilometres with thousands of settlements, compared to an area of only about 65,000 square kilometres for the occupied area of Mesopotamia, while the largest cities were comparable in size at about 30,000–40,000 inhabitants.

There were altogether about 1,500 Indus valley cities, amounting to a population of perhaps 5 million at the maximum time of their florescence. In contrast, the total urban population of Mesopotamia in 2,500 BCE was around 290,000.

Large-scale exchanges recovered with the Achaemenid conquest of the Indus Valley, circa 500 BCE.

Views of cultural diffusion 
Many scholars have pointed towards exaggerated notions of cultural diffusions from Western Asia to South Asia, such as when overlinking Vedic astronomy and mathematics to Sumerian origins. Likewise scholars have questioned the supposed borrowings of Western Asian motifs without the evidence of any actual artifact and trade contacts. Recent archaeogenetic research based on DNA samples collected from the Harappan site of Rakhigarhi suggests that Western Asian migration to northern India occurred as early as 12,000 years ago, but that the rise of agriculture in India was a later phenomenon, probably due to cultural exchanges around 2,000 years later, rather than direct migration. According to Richard H.Meadow, evidence gathered from Mehrgarh points towards domestication of sheep, cattle and goats as a separate local phenomenon in South Asia around 7,000 BCE.

See also

Notes

References

Sources

Bibliography 

 
 
 
 
 
 
 
 

Akkadian Empire
Ancient international relations
Indus Valley civilisation
Foreign relations of ancient India
Indian Ocean trade